The Ye'kuana, also called Ye'kwana, Ye'Kuana, Yekuana, Yequana, Yecuana, Dekuana, Maquiritare, Makiritare, So'to or Maiongong, are a Cariban-speaking tropical rain-forest tribe who live in the Caura River and Orinoco River regions of Venezuela in Bolivar State and Amazonas State. In Brazil, they inhabit the northeast of Roraima State.
In Venezuela, the Ye'kuana live alongside their former enemies, the Sanumá (Yanomami subgroup).

When the Ye'kuana wish to refer to themselves, they use the word So'to, which can be translated as "people", "person". Ye’kuana, in turn, can be translated as "canoe people", "people of the canoes" or even "people of the branch in the river".

They live in communal houses called Atta or ëttë. The circular structure has a cone-shaped roof made of palm leaves. Building the atta is considered a spiritual activity in which the group reproduces the great cosmic home of the Creator. 

The first reference to the Ye'kuana was in 1744 by a Jesuit priest called Manuel Román in his travels to investigate the existence of the Casiquiare canal. He recruited the services of the Ye'kuana to help him on his way.

The Alto Orinoco-Casiquiare Biosphere Reserve was established by the Venezuelan government in 1993 with the objective of preserving the traditional territory and lifestyle of the Yanomami and Ye'kuana peoples.
There are some 6,250 Ye'kuana in Venezuela, according to the 2001 census, with some 430 in Brazil.  

Jean Liedloff came into contact with the Ye'kuana in the 1950s, while working as a photographer for Italian diamond-hunters, and in subsequent personal visits. She based her book The Continuum Concept: In Search of Happiness Lost on their way of life, particularly the upbringing of their children. Liedloff noted the stark contrast between the treatment of Western and Ye'kuana infants, who are normally held "in-arms" 24 hours a day by their mothers and by other familiar adults and children who take care of them.

Notes

Further reading
 David. M. Guss: "To Weave and Sing: Art, Symbol, and Narrative in the South American Rainforest" (University of California Press, 1990)
 Jean Liedoff: "The Continuum Concept: In Search of Happiness Lost"  
 Knab-Vispo, C. C. (2003). Ecological observations on heteropsis spp. (araceae) in southern Venezuela. Economic Botany, 57(3), 345–353. 

Ethnic groups in Brazil
Indigenous peoples in Brazil
Indigenous peoples in Venezuela